Mamman Kwagyang Saleh (born 2 January 1958), is a Nigerian government official that served as Minister of Power from August 2019 to September 2021. He was sworn in by President Muhammadu Buhari on 21 August 2019 after being nominated by Buhari and confirmed by the Senate. On 1 September 2021, Mamman was sacked by Buhari and replaced by Minister of State for Works and Housing Abubakar Aliyu.

Early life and education 
Saleh is from Taraba State. He holds a higher national diploma in electrical electronics from Kaduna Polytechnic, graduating in 1988. He also hold an MBA in business administration from Bayero University Kano, graduating in 2015.

Career
Saleh started his career in 1981 as a teacher in Technical School, Mubi, Adamawa State. In 1992, he transferred his service to Taraba State. He was promoted to the rank of assistant director in the ministry of works in Taraba State and retired in 2002. After his retirement, he became a full-time businessman and politician.

See also
Cabinet of Nigeria

References

Federal ministers of Nigeria
People from Taraba State
Bayero University Kano alumni
Kaduna Polytechnic alumni
Living people
1958 births